King Baby is an album by American stand-up comedian Jim Gaffigan.

CD and DVD release
The album was released on March 31, 2009, by Comedy Central Records and was also released with the same title on DVD. The album was recorded at The Paramount Theatre in Austin, Texas.

CD track listing
Inside Voice (1:59)
Bowling (5:11)
Lazy (3:05)
Escalators (3:16)
Camping (4:55)
Bed (4:37)
Bacon (4:52)
Ribs and Bologna (3:32)
Recycling (4:03)
Deodorant (4:08)
Circumcision (4:51)
Almost Heaven (5:07)
House Guest (1:54)
Dunkin' Donuts (2:29)
Fast Food (5:15)
Catsup (4:37)
Waffle House (3:01)

DVD release
Jim Gaffigan's stand up special King Baby was released on March 31, 2009, on DVD. The DVD was uncensored and uncut with 72 minutes of material. The special was directed by Troy Miller and was Jim Gaffigan's second stand-up DVD release, the other being Beyond the Pale. In addition to the main performance, the DVD also contains seven bonus features of behind the scenes footage and interviews.

References 

Jim Gaffigan albums
Comedy Central Records live albums
Stand-up comedy albums
Live spoken word albums
2009 video albums
Live video albums
2009 albums
2000s comedy albums